Matías Ignacio Fernández Cordero (born 14 August 1995) is a Chilean footballer who plays for Ecuadorian club Independiente del Valle as a midfielder or wing back.

Career
He joined to Wanderers’ youth ranks when he was 11.

On second half 2022, Fernández moved to Ecuador and joined Independiente del Valle.

Honours

Club
Santiago Wanderers
Primera B: 2019
Copa Chile: 2017

References

External links
 Fernández at Football Lineups
 

1995 births
Living people
Sportspeople from Valparaíso
Chilean footballers
Chilean expatriate footballers
Santiago Wanderers footballers
Unión La Calera footballers
Chilean Primera División players
Primera B de Chile players
Ecuadorian Serie A players
Chilean expatriate sportspeople in Ecuador
Expatriate footballers in Ecuador
Association football midfielders